Vid Vrhovnik (born 12 July 1999 in Slovenj Gradec) is a Slovenian Nordic combined skier.

Vrhovnik won the gold medal at the ski jumping team competition at the 2016 Winter Youth Olympics, together with Ema Klinec and Bor Pavlovčič. In 2018, Vrhovnik became the Junior World Champion in Nordic combined. He represented Slovenia at the 2018 Winter Olympics in Pyeongchang, South Korea. His personal best is 48s.

References

 

1999 births
Living people
Slovenian male Nordic combined skiers
Nordic combined skiers at the 2018 Winter Olympics
Nordic combined skiers at the 2022 Winter Olympics
Olympic Nordic combined skiers of Slovenia
Nordic combined skiers at the 2016 Winter Youth Olympics
Youth Olympic gold medalists for Slovenia
21st-century Slovenian people